The Aureliano Chaves Building is a commercial building inaugurated in 2014 in Belo Horizonte, Minas Gerais, Brazil, designed by Gustavo Penna Arquiteto & Associados and Trínia Arquitetura. The building is owned by Forluz (Fundação Forluminas de Seguridade Social), a pension fund for CEMIG employees, and is currently the tallest in the city of Belo Horizonte. The building is named after Aureliano Chaves, former governor of the state of Minas Gerais and former vice-president of Brazil.

Development 
The new building was proposed by Forluz with the aim of creating a new headquarters for CEMIG on a parcel next to the company's current headquarters. A closed tender was held between architecture offices in Belo Horizonte. A partnership between the Trínia Arquitetura and Gustavo Penna offices won the competition and was hired to develop the project. The competition was awarded in 2007 and the project kicked off in 2008, with approvals and construction happening over a period of 6 years. The building was inaugurated in 2014.

Architecture 

The building is the first in Minas Gerais to receive the Gold rating of the LEED certification (Leadership in Energy and Environmental Design). The project was consulted by Labcon, the Thermal Comfort Laboratory of the School of Architecture at the Federal University of Minas Gerais, under the coordination of architect and professor Roberta Vieira Gonçalves de Souza. Following the shift in design towards sustainability, the construction costs of the building were increased by around 7% and yielded savings of 19% in energy consumption and 40% in water consumption.

Occupying a triangular block, the building tower is oriented in an east-west axis, with blind facades at the east and west ends - the ones which receive more intense sunlight. The north and south façades, with milder insolation, are glazed to take advantage of natural lighting, and the north façade is covered with horizontal brises soleil to soften direct solar incidence during the winter.

Throughout the LEED certification process, the initial studies for the design were evaluated with concept C in envelope, D in natural lighting and B in air conditioning, with its final rating estimated as B; following adjustments made throughout the consulting process, with various adjustments to windows, building and finishing materials, the building received the triple A rating.

Usage 
CEMIG initially occupied 21 of the building's 24 floors. Following retirements and a Voluntary Separation Incentive Payment (VSIP) program carried out by the company, its headquarters building, next to the Aureliano Chaves building, were able to take in all the remaining workforce, and therefore CEMIG started to vacate parts of the new building. The pension fund that owns the building then leased four floors of the property to Banco Inter in 2019. In 2021, the bank leased the entire building, with an initial contract of 5 years.

References

Pages using the Kartographer extension
Coordinates on Wikidata
Sustainable architecture
Commercial buildings in Brazil